Francisco Román Alarcón Suárez (born 21 April 1992), commonly known as Isco, is a Spanish professional footballer who plays as an attacking midfielder. 

He began his career at Valencia, playing mainly in its reserve team, before joining Málaga in 2011. His performances at Málaga earned him the Golden Boy award in 2012, and a €30 million move to Real Madrid in June 2013, with whom he has won 20 major trophies including five UEFA Champions League titles, three La Liga titles, one Copa del Rey and four FIFA Club World Cup titles.

Isco represented Spain at various youth levels, including at the 2012 Olympics, and made his senior international debut in 2013, later taking part at the 2018 FIFA World Cup.

Club career

Valencia
Isco was born in Benalmádena, Málaga, Andalusia. As a child he played for Atlético Benamiel, where his teammates included Charlie I'Anson. A product of Valencia's youth system, he spent the 2009–10 season with the club's reserve team in Segunda División B, netting once in 26 games and suffering relegation.

While still registered with the reserves, Isco made his debut with the first team on 11 November 2010, against Logroñés in the 2010–11 Copa del Rey, scoring two goals in a 4–1 home win (Paco Alcácer made his senior debut in the same fixture). He played his first La Liga match three days later, featuring for 20 minutes in a 2–0 home win against Getafe after coming on as a substitute for Aritz Aduriz; he thereafter made three further league appearances and two in the UEFA Champions League, all from the bench, and helped the B-team return to the third level by scoring 15 goals in their campaign.

Málaga
In mid-July 2011, Isco signed a five-year contract with Málaga after the club activated his buy-out clause of €6 million. He scored his first goal for his new team on 21 November 2011, starting in a 3–1 away win against Racing de Santander; he netted again the following week in a 2–1 win against Villareal, and finished his first season with 32 games and five goals as the side qualified for the UEFA Champions League for the first time in its history.

On 18 September 2012, in Málaga's first game in the Champions League group stage, Isco netted twice in a 3–0 home win over Zenit, also being chosen as Man of the Match. On 22 December he scored the first goal in an eventual 3–2 win against Real Madrid at La Rosaleda, leading the locals to their first victory over that opponent in 29 years; in December he won the Golden Boy award, beating Stephan El Shaarawy and Thibaut Courtois.

On 28 January 2013, Isco ended speculation regarding his future by signing a new contract with Málaga – his new buyout clause was set at €35 million. He scored his eleventh goal of the campaign on 13 March, netting the opener in a 2–0 home win against Porto, good enough for last-eight qualification after the 0–1 first leg loss at the Estádio do Dragão.

Real Madrid
On 17 June 2013, Isco confirmed that he had received offers from Real Madrid and former Málaga manager Manuel Pellegrini's Manchester City, but stated he would only make a final decision on his future after the UEFA European Under-21 Championship final. On 26 June, Real Madrid president Florentino Pérez confirmed that a deal had been reached with the player and that he would be presented by the club next week, once he passed his medical; the following day he signed a five-year contract, with Real Madrid paying €30 million for his services, thus becoming the first signing of newly appointed manager Carlo Ancelotti.

On 18 August 2013 Isco made his official debut for the Merengues, recording an assist and scoring the winning goal in a 2–1 home win over Real Betis, the latter coming through an 85th-minute header. He continued with his form by netting two goals against Athletic Bilbao on 1 September (3–1, also at the Santiago Bernabéu).

In spite of continuing to score regularly when featured, Isco received limited opportunities in the first team due to the 4–3–3 formation not being suited for his style, but Ancelotti stated that it was "a temporary problem". He scored 11 goals in 53 official games in his first season, including 61 minutes in the Champions League final, a 4–1 win over Atlético Madrid in Lisbon.

Isco started the first game of the 2014–15 season against Real Sociedad, and scored the first in a 4–1 win against Almería on 12 December 2014. He was a regular starter in the club's FIFA Club World Cup winning campaign, scoring the last in a 4–0 semi-final routing of Cruz Azul. His performances over the season earned him many plaudits, and he was compared to Zinedine Zidane by the French legend himself.

Prior to the start of the 2015–16 season, Isco switched his shirt number from 23 to 22, which he had previously worn at Málaga. On 21 November 2015, as Real lost 0–4 at home to Barcelona in El Clásico, he was sent off in the 84th minute for a foul on Neymar. He scored twice on 2 December, as the team won 3–1 at Cádiz in the first leg of the last 32 of the domestic cup. Isco was a part-time starter when the team won the 2015–16 UEFA Champions League defeating Atlético Madrid 5–3 on penalties in the final played at the San Siro in Milan, Italy.

He appeared 30 times during the 2016–17 season, as Real Madrid won the La Liga title; he also started in the 2016–17 UEFA Champions League final against Juventus in Cardiff, which Madrid won 4–1.

On 8 August 2017, Isco scored a goal in the 2017 UEFA Super Cup, contributing to Real Madrid's 2–1 victory against Manchester United. His performance earned him the man of the match award. In September 2017, he signed a new deal with Real Madrid until June 2022. During the 2017–18 UEFA Champions League, he made eleven appearances, when Madrid won their third consecutive and 13th overall Champions League title as they beat Liverpool 3–1 in Kyiv. He made 23 appearances during the league season, as Real Madrid won the 2019–20 La Liga. In the 2021–22 season he was not an important player under Carlo Ancelotti as Real Madrid triumphed in 2021–22 La Liga and the 2021–22 UEFA Champions League. On 30 May 2022, Isco confirmed on social media that he was leaving the club after nine years.

Sevilla
On 7 August 2022, Sevilla announced that the club reached an agreement in principle for the signing of Isco, with the player agreeing to a two-year contract. On 21 December 2022, Isco and Sevilla agreed to terminate their contract. On 22 December, Sevilla coach Jorge Sampaoli said Isco "did not meet the club's expectations".

On 31 January 2023, his supposed transfer to Bundesliga club Union Berlin collapsed, despite passing medical tests, as the German club confirmed that the player's demands afterwards differed from the original agreement.

International career

Isco appeared with Spain's U17 in 2009 FIFA World Cup, scoring three times in the process as the nation finished third. In 2011 he represented his country – together with Málaga teammate Recio – in the U-20 World Cup held in Colombia, netting one goal in an eventual quarter-final exit.

On 28 February 2012, Isco was called to the Spain under-23s team for a friendly against Egypt, but did not leave the bench. On 15 May he was picked for the first time to the senior team for friendlies with Serbia and South Korea, but took no part in either match. In July, he went with the under-23 team to the Olympics in London, starting all of Spain's matches as they were eliminated without scoring a goal.

On 6 February 2013, Isco made his debut with the main squad, playing the last 30 minutes in a 3–1 win over Uruguay in Doha, Qatar. Also that year he appeared at the UEFA European Under-21 Championship in Israel, he scored in the final and finished the competition with the Bronze Boot (3 Goals) and made the team of the tournament as a key player for the eventual winners.

Isco scored his first international goal for Spain in a UEFA Euro 2016 qualifying match against Belarus in Huelva on 15 November 2014, opening a 3–0 win.

Isco scored his first hat-trick for Spain on 27 March 2018, netting three goals against Argentina in a 6–1 friendly win.

In May 2018, he was named in Spain's final squad for the 2018 FIFA World Cup. He scored his first and only goal in the last group stage match against Morocco, in an eventual 2–2 draw. His goal helped the team to qualify to the second round as group winners.

In May 2021, Isco was omitted from Spain's 26-man squad for UEFA Euro 2020.

Style of play

Isco began his career as an attacking midfielder or as a second striker: at Málaga, under Manuel Pellegrini, he often played in an attacking role in the team's 4–2–3–1 formation. Following his move to Real Madrid, manager Carlo Ancelotti also played him in a deep-lying playmaker role requiring more sacrifice and defensive duties than his natural position. He has also been deployed as a winger on occasion.

A quick, skillful and creative player, with excellent technique and ball control, Isco is known for his natural ability to pick out an inch-perfect pass, dribble effortlessly through two or three challenges or drift a shot into the top corner of the goal. His one-step-ahead reading of the game, his anticipation of space and the general directing of his side's performances are his most common traits.

In 2013, Isco was credited by Marca journalist Pablo Polo as being "the most promising young player in Spanish football", comparing his strength, skill, and low centre of gravity to Sergio Agüero, and his vision and passing abilities to Zinedine Zidane. Former Real Madrid captain Iker Casillas predicted in 2015 that Isco would become Spain's most important player.

Career statistics

Club

International

Scores and results list Spain's goal tally first.

Honours
Valencia Mestalla
Tercera División Group VI: 2010–11

Real Madrid
La Liga: 2016–17, 2019–20, 2021–22
Copa del Rey: 2013–14
Supercopa de España: 2017, 2019–20, 2021–22
UEFA Champions League: 2013–14, 2015–16, 2016–17, 2017–18, 2021–22
UEFA Super Cup: 2014, 2016, 2017
FIFA Club World Cup: 2014, 2016, 2017, 2018

Spain U17
FIFA U-17 World Cup third place: 2009

Spain U21
UEFA European Under-21 Championship: 2013

Individual
 Golden Boy Award: 2012
 La Liga Breakthrough Player: 2012
 UEFA European Under-21 Championship Bronze Boot: 2013
 UEFA European Under-21 Championship Team of the Tournament: 2013
 Trofeo Bravo: 2013
 UEFA Champions League Team of the Season: 2016–17
 FIFA FIFPro World XI 2nd team: 2017
 FIFA FIFPro World XI 3rd team: 2018
 FIFA FIFPro World XI 5th team: 2013

Personal life
Isco dated Victoria Calderon; the couple had a son. With actress Sara Sálamo he has two more sons.

References

External links

Real Madrid official profile

CiberChe biography 

Isco – WhoScored Profile

1992 births
Living people
Sportspeople from the Province of Málaga
Spanish footballers
Footballers from Andalusia
Association football midfielders
Valencia CF Mestalla footballers
Valencia CF players
Málaga CF players
Real Madrid CF players
Sevilla FC players
Tercera División players
Segunda División B players
La Liga players
UEFA Champions League winning players
Spain youth international footballers
Spain under-21 international footballers
Spain under-23 international footballers
Olympic footballers of Spain
Spain international footballers
Footballers at the 2012 Summer Olympics
2018 FIFA World Cup players
Golden Boy winners